Sargis or Sarkis is a male given name in both Armenian and Assyrian communities. The Armenian surname Sargsyan/Sarkisian is derived from this name.

Etymology
The name ultimately derived from the Latin name Sergius.

Assyrian Tradition

In the Assyrian community, the name Sargis is a common veneration to Saint Sergius who was martyred in the Syriac speaking city of Resafa, popularizing the name in the language amongst liturgically Syriac speaking communities since at least the 4th century.

List of notable people or places with the name Sargis

Saints

Sargis the General, 4th century Armenian saint, not to be confused with Saint Sergius
Sargis of Samarkand, Church of the East saint

Places
Mar Sargis Village, an Assyrian settlement located near Seiri, Urmia, Iran

Churches

Mar Sargis Assyrian Church of the East in Seiri, Urmia (201-300 AD)
Saint Sargis Church of Ashtarak
Saint Sargis Monastery of Ushi
Saint Sargis Church of Tabriz
Mar Sargis Assyrian Church of the East in Skokie, Illinois

Mononym
Sargis of Aïbeg and Serkis
Sargis (Nestorian Patriarch), Patriarch of the Church of the East (860-872)

First name
Sargis I Jaqeli (died 1285), Georgian nobleman of the House of Jaqeli and sovereign Prince
Sargis Barkhudaryan (1887–1973), Armenian composer, pianist and educator
Sargis Hovhannisyan (born 1968), Armenian football player
Sargis Hovsepyan, (born 1972), Armenian football player
Sargis Kakabadze (1886-1967), Georgian historian and philologist
Sargis Karapetyan (born 1963), Armenian football player 
Sargis Karapetyan (born 1990), Armenian football player 
Sargis Mehrabyan (died 1943), Armenian military figure
Sargis Pitsak, early 14th century Armenian artist
Sargis Sargsian, (born 1973), former professional tennis player from Armenia
Sargis Tmogveli, late 12th and early 13th century Georgian statesman and writer.
Sargis Yosip, Assyrian bishop from Iraq
Sargis Reshaina, 6th century physician and priest who translated Greek medical works into Syriac
Sargis Bkhira

Last name
Ashur Bet Sargis (born 1949), Assyrian composer and singer
Hayden Sargis, Assyrian soccer player

See also
Sarkis
Sergius
Serge (given name)
Serj
Sargent (name)

References

Armenian masculine given names